St Barnabas College is an Australian theological school in North Adelaide, South Australia. The college is affiliated with the Anglican Church of Australia and Charles Sturt University.

References

External links 
 
 

Schools in Adelaide